Camenca (Moldovan Cyrillic: Каменка;) is a town in Transnistria, a breakaway republic internationally recognized as part of Moldova. It is composed of the town itself and the village of Solnecinoe. Camenca is the seat of Camenca District.

In 1989, it had a population of 13,689. According to the 2004 Census in Transnistria, the town itself has 10,323 inhabitants, including 5,296 Moldovans, 3,476 Ukrainians, 1,305 Russians, 61 Belarusians, 42 Poles, 35 Bulgarians, 32 Gagauzes, 23 Germans, 10 Armenians, 8 Jews, 3 Gypsies and 32 others.

The mayor is Pyotr Mustya.

Historical affiliations
 Polish–Lithuanian Commonwealth (1609–1672)
 Ottoman Empire (1672–1699)
 Polish–Lithuanian Commonwealth (1699–1793)
 (1793–1917)
 Russian Republic (1917)
 Soviet Russia (1917–1918)
 Soviet Ukraine (1920–1924)
 Moldavian ASSR (1924–1940)
 Moldavian SSR (1940–1941)
 Kingdom of Romania (1941–1944)
 Moldavian SSR (1944–1991)
 (de facto; 1991–present);  (de jure; 1991–present)

Notable people 
 Nicolae Coval (1904 in Camenca – 1970 in Chișinău) was a Moldavian SSR politician, prime minister of Moldavian SSR 1945 – 1946
 Pyotr Vershigora (1905 in Severinovca - 1963) was a Soviet writer and one of the leaders of the Soviet partisan movement in Ukraine, Belarus and Poland.

Gallery

References

External links 
 Eco-tourism in Eastern Europe, Camenca
 Kamionka (Camenca) in the Geographical Dictionary of the Kingdom of Poland (1882) 
 Kamenka info, photos
 Map

Cities and towns in Transnistria
Cities and towns in Moldova
Olgopolsky Uyezd
Camenca District